First Lady Suite is a chamber musical by Michael John LaChiusa. The musical contains four separate segments about four of the First Ladies of the United States of America and the people surrounding them. They are: Eleanor Roosevelt, Mamie Eisenhower, Bess Truman, and Jacqueline Bouvier Kennedy. It premiered Off-Broadway in 1993.

Productions
The chamber musical was produced by the New York Shakespeare Festival at the Public Theater from November 30, 1993 through December 26, 1993, running for 32 performances. Directed by Kirsten Sanderson, it featured Alice Playten (Lady Bird Johnson and Mamie Eisenhower), Debra Stricklin (Margaret Truman), Carolann Page (Eleanor Roosevelt), Maureen Moore (Amelia Earhart, Jacqueline Bouvier Kennedy), and David Wasson (Dwight Eisenhower, Bess Truman). The production received the Obie Award, Performance (Playten) and Special Citation (LaChiusa).

The Blank Theatre, Los Angeles, California, presented a revised version of the musical from March 7, 2002 – April 14, 2002.  Directed by Daniel Henning, the cast featured Gregory Jbara as Dwight Eisenhower/Bess Truman/Presidential Aide, Kate Shindle as Amelia Earhart, Evelyn Halus as Eleanor Roosevelt/Evelyn Lincoln, Heather Lee as Mary Gallagher, Bronwen Booth as Jacqueline Kennedy, Irene Warner as Lady Bird Johnson/Ike's Chauffeur/Margaret Truman, Eydie Alyson as Mamie Eisenhower, Mary-Pat Green as Lorena Hickock and Paula Newsome as Marian Anderson/The First Lady.

A New York revival produced by Transport Group Theatre Company ran at The Connelly Theater in New York City from April 6, 2004 through April 17, 2004. This production received two Drama Desk Award nominations: Outstanding Revival of a Musical and Outstanding Featured Actress in a Musical (Mary Testa). Directed by Jack Cummings III, the cast included Julia Murney (Amelia Earhart), Mary Beth Peil (Eleanor Roosevelt), Mary Testa (Lorena Hickok), Robyn Hussa (Jacqueline Bouvier Kennedy), Sherry D. Boone (Marian Anderson), Donna Lynne Champlin, Ruth Gottschall (Margaret Truman), James Hindman (Eisenhower, and Cheryl Stern (Mamie Eisenhower).

The 2004 revival had the added prologue and epilogue, sung individually and by the group, which explains the theme, to "fly away from the constraints that come with the traditional First Lady's privileged life." The Transport Group Theatre Company's acclaimed 2004 NYC revival was filmed for preservation by The Theatre on Film and Tape Archive, a division of The New York Performing Arts Library at Lincoln Center.

The cast album from the Blank Theater production is available on PS Classics.

The show had its London premiere at the Union Theatre between September 29 and October 17, 2009.

Plot

The plot contains four unrelated stories and a prologue.

Prologue
A nameless, African American First Lady reflects on her place in history.

Over Texas
Aboard Air Force One on November 22, 1963, Jacqueline Kennedy's underpaid, overworked Secretary Mary Gallagher complains about her demanding employer to John F Kennedy's secretary Evelyn Lincoln before a foreboding dream reconciles herself to her place in history.

Where's Mamie?
The White House, 1957. Feeling abandoned by her husband's absence on her birthday, Mamie Eisenhower fantasizes a trip through time and space alongside Marian Anderson to prevent her husband from having an affair and to alert him to the racial strife that will soon mar his Presidency.

Olio
1950. Margaret Truman attempts to sing at a Recital, but is constantly upstaged by her mother Bess.

Eleanor Sleeps Here
Inside Amelia Earhart's plane, 1936. As they fly over Washington in a plane piloted by Amelia Earheart, Hickok bitterly reviews her complicated relationship with her lover, friend and employer Eleanor Roosevelt.

References

External links
 Internet Off-Broadway database listing

1993 musicals
Off-Broadway musicals